Mount Tabor is a hamlet in Calderdale, West Yorkshire, England, named after the biblical Battle of Mount Tabor mentioned in the Book of Judges. The hamlet is in the Warley ward of Calderdale.

The hamlet is served by buses from Halifax bus station.

A post box in the hamlet is painted gold, to commemorate one of Hannah Cockroft's 2012 Summer Paralympics gold medals.

The author Whiteley Turner lived in Mount Tabor.

See also
Listed buildings in Warley, West Yorkshire

References

External links 

 

Hamlets in West Yorkshire
Geography of Calderdale